Edmund Thomas Sweetman (1912 – 16 December 1968) was an Irish Fine Gael politician, who was a member of Seanad Éireann from 1948 to 1951. A solicitor, he was an unsuccessful Fine Gael candidate for the Wicklow constituency at the 1944 and 1948 general elections. He was nominated by the Taoiseach to the Seanad in 1948. He did not contest the 1951 Seanad election.

His father Roger Sweetman was a Sinn Féin Teachta Dála (TD) for Wexford North from 1918 to 1921.

See also
Families in the Oireachtas

References

1912 births
1968 deaths
Irish solicitors
Fine Gael senators
Members of the 6th Seanad
Politicians from County Wicklow
20th-century Irish lawyers
Nominated members of Seanad Éireann